In mathematics, the Chinese remainder theorem states that if one knows the remainders of the Euclidean division of an integer n by several integers, then one can determine uniquely the remainder of the division of n by the product of these integers, under the condition that the divisors are pairwise coprime (no two divisors share a common factor other than 1).

For example, if we know that the remainder of n divided by 3 is 2, the remainder of n divided by 5 is 3, and the remainder of n divided by 7 is 2, then without knowing the value of n, we can determine that the remainder of n divided by 105 (the product of 3, 5, and 7) is 23. Importantly, this tells us that if n is a natural number less than 105, then 23 is the only possible value of n.

The earliest known statement of the theorem is by the Chinese mathematician Sun-tzu in the Sun-tzu Suan-ching in the 3rd century CE.

The Chinese remainder theorem is widely used for computing with large integers, as it allows replacing a computation for which one knows a bound on the size of the result by several similar computations on small integers.

The Chinese remainder theorem (expressed in terms of congruences) is true over every principal ideal domain. It has been generalized to any ring, with a formulation involving two-sided ideals.

History
The earliest known statement of the theorem, as a problem with specific numbers, appears in the 3rd-century book Sun-tzu Suan-ching by the Chinese mathematician Sun-tzu:

Sun-tzu's work contains neither a proof nor a full algorithm. What amounts to an algorithm for solving this problem was described by Aryabhata (6th century). Special cases of the Chinese remainder theorem were also known to Brahmagupta (7th century), and appear in Fibonacci's Liber Abaci (1202). The result was later generalized with a complete solution called Da-yan-shu in Ch'in Chiu-shao's 1247 Mathematical Treatise in Nine Sections (Shu-shu Chiu-chang) which was translated into English in early 19th century by British missionary Alexander Wylie.

The notion of congruences was first introduced and used by Carl Friedrich Gauss in his Disquisitiones Arithmeticae of 1801. Gauss illustrates the Chinese remainder theorem on a problem involving calendars, namely, "to find the years that have a certain period number with respect to the solar and lunar cycle and the Roman indiction." Gauss introduces a procedure for solving the problem that had already been used by Leonhard Euler but was in fact an ancient method that had appeared several times.

Statement
Let n1, ..., nk be integers greater than 1, which are often called moduli or divisors. Let us denote by N the product of the ni.

The Chinese remainder theorem asserts that if the ni are pairwise coprime, and if a1, ..., ak are integers such that 0 ≤ ai < ni for every i, then there is one and only one integer x, such that 0 ≤ x < N and the remainder of the Euclidean division of x by ni is ai for every i.

This may be restated as follows in terms of congruences:

has a solution, and any two solutions, say x1 and x2, are congruent modulo N, that is, .

In abstract algebra, the theorem is often restated as: if the ni are pairwise coprime, the map

defines a ring isomorphism

between the ring of integers modulo N and the direct product of the rings of integers modulo the ni. This means that for doing a sequence of arithmetic operations in  one may do the same computation independently in each  and then get the result by applying the isomorphism (from the right to the left). This may be much faster than the direct computation if N and the number of operations are large. This is widely used, under the name multi-modular computation, for linear algebra over the integers or the rational numbers.

The theorem can also be restated in the language of combinatorics as the fact that the infinite arithmetic progressions of integers form a Helly family.

Proof
The existence and the uniqueness of the solution may be proven independently. However, the first proof of existence, given below, uses this uniqueness.

Uniqueness

Existence (first proof)
The map

maps congruence classes modulo  to sequences of congruence classes modulo . The proof of uniqueness shows that this map is injective. As the domain and the codomain of this map have the same number of elements, the map is also surjective, which proves the existence of the solution.

This proof is very simple but does not provide any direct way for computing a solution. Moreover, it cannot be generalized to other situations where the following proof can.

Existence (constructive proof)
This construction may be split into two steps, first solving the problem in the case of two moduli, and then extending this solution to the general case by induction on the number of moduli.

Case of two moduli
We want to solve the system:

Bézout's identity asserts the existence of two integers  and  such that 

The integers  and  may be computed by the extended Euclidean algorithm.

A solution is given by

Indeed, 

implying that  The second congruence is proved similarly, by exchanging the subscripts 1 and 2.

General case
Consider a sequence of congruence equations:

The two first equations have a solution  provided by the method of the previous section. The set of the solutions of these two first equations is the set of all solutions of the equation

As the other  are coprime with  this reduces solving the initial problem of  equations to a similar problem with  equations. Iterating the process, one gets eventually the solutions of the initial problem.

Existence (direct construction)
For constructing a solution, it is not necessary to make an induction on the number of moduli. However, such a direct construction involves more computation with large numbers, which makes it less efficient and less used. Nevertheless, Lagrange interpolation is a special case of this construction, applied to polynomials instead of integers.

Let  be the product of all moduli but one. Thus Bézout's identity applies, and there exist integers  and  such that

A solution of the system of congruences is

we have

for every

Computation
Consider a system of congruences:

Systematic search

Although very simple, this method is very inefficient.

Therefore, this method is rarely used, neither for hand-written computation nor on computers.

Search by sieving

The search of the solution may be made dramatically faster by sieving. For this method, we suppose, without loss of generality, that  (if it were not the case, it would suffice to replace each  by the remainder of its division by ). This implies that the solution belongs to the arithmetic progression

By testing the values of these numbers modulo  one eventually finds a solution  of the two first congruences. Then the solution belongs to the arithmetic progression 

Testing the values of these numbers modulo , and continuing until every modulus has been tested gives eventually the solution.

This method is faster if the moduli have been ordered by decreasing value, that is if  For the example, this gives the following computation. We consider first the numbers that are congruent to 4 modulo 5 (the largest modulus), which are 4, ... For each of them, compute the remainder by 4 (the second largest modulus) until getting a number congruent to 3 modulo 4. Then one can proceed  by adding  at each step, and computing only the remainders by 3. This gives
4 mod 4 → 0. Continue
4 + 5 = 9 mod 4 →1.  Continue
9 + 5 = 14 mod 4 → 2. Continue
14 + 5 = 19 mod 4 → 3. OK, continue by considering remainders modulo 3 and adding 5 × 4 = 20 each time
19 mod 3 → 1. Continue
19 + 20 = 39 mod 3 → 0. OK, this is the result.

This method works well for hand-written computation with a product of moduli that is not too big. However, it is much slower than other methods, for very large products of moduli. Although dramatically faster than the systematic search, this method also has an exponential time complexity and is therefore not used on computers.

Using the existence construction
The constructive existence proof shows that, in the case of two moduli, the solution may be obtained by the computation of the Bézout coefficients of the moduli, followed by a few multiplications, additions and reductions modulo  (for getting a result in the interval ). As the Bézout's coefficients may be computed with the extended Euclidean algorithm, the whole computation, at most, has a quadratic time complexity of  where  denotes the number of digits of 

For more than two moduli, the method for two moduli allows the replacement of any two congruences by a single congruence modulo the product of the moduli. Iterating this process provides eventually the solution with a complexity, which is quadratic in the number of digits of the product of all moduli. This quadratic time complexity does not depend on the order in which the moduli are regrouped. One may regroup the two first moduli, then regroup the resulting modulus with the next one, and so on. This strategy is the easiest to implement, but it also requires more computation involving large numbers.

Another strategy consists in partitioning the moduli in pairs whose product have comparable sizes (as much as possible), applying, in parallel, the method of two moduli to each pair, and iterating with a number of moduli approximatively divided by two. This method allows an easy parallelization of the algorithm. Also, if fast algorithms (that is, algorithms working in quasilinear time) are used for the basic operations, this method provides an algorithm for the whole computation that works in quasilinear time.

On the current example (which has only three moduli), both strategies are identical and work as follows.

Bézout's identity for 3 and 4 is

Putting this in the formula given for proving the existence gives 

One may continue with any of these solutions, but the solution  is smaller (in absolute value) and thus leads probably to an easier computation

Bézout identity for 5 and 3 × 4 = 12 is

Applying the same formula again, we get a solution of the problem:

As a linear Diophantine system
The system of congruences solved by the Chinese remainder theorem may be rewritten as a system of linear Diophantine equations:

However, as usual when using a general algorithm for a more specific problem, this approach is less efficient than the method of the preceding section, based on a direct use of Bézout's identity.

Over principal ideal domains
In , the Chinese remainder theorem has been stated in three different ways: in terms of remainders, of congruences, and of a ring isomorphism. The statement in terms of remainders does not apply, in general, to principal ideal domains, as remainders are not defined in such rings. These two versions of the theorem are true in this context, because the proofs (except for the first existence proof), are based on Euclid's lemma and Bézout's identity, which are true over every principal domain.

However, in general, the theorem is only an existence theorem and does not provide any way for computing the solution, unless one has an algorithm for computing the coefficients of Bézout's identity.

Over univariate polynomial rings and Euclidean domains
The statement in terms of remainders given in  cannot be generalized to any principal ideal domain, but its generalization to Euclidean domains is straightforward. The univariate polynomials over a field is the typical example of a Euclidean domain which is not the integers. Therefore, we state the theorem for the case of the ring  for a field  For getting the theorem for a general Euclidean domain, it suffices to replace the degree by the Euclidean function of the Euclidean domain.

However, the latter construction may be simplified by using, as follows, partial fraction decomposition instead of the extended Euclidean algorithm.

Thus, we want to find a polynomial , which satisfies the congruences

for 

Consider the polynomials

The partial fraction decomposition of  gives  polynomials  with degrees  such that

and thus

Then a solution of the simultaneous congruence system is given by the polynomial

In fact, we have
 
for 

Lagrange interpolation
A special case of Chinese remainder theorem for polynomials is Lagrange interpolation. For this, consider  monic polynomials of degree one:

Now, let  be constants (polynomials of degree 0) in  Both Lagrange interpolation and Chinese remainder theorem assert the existence of a unique polynomial  of degree less than  such that

for every 

Lagrange interpolation formula is exactly the result, in this case, of the above construction of the solution. More precisely, let

In fact, reducing the right-hand side to a common denominator one gets

Using the above general formula, we get the Lagrange interpolation formula:

Hermite interpolation
Hermite interpolation is an application of the Chinese remainder theorem for univariate polynomials, which may involve moduli of arbitrary degrees (Lagrange interpolation involves only moduli of degree one).

The problem consists of finding a polynomial of the least possible degree, such that the polynomial and its first derivatives take given values at some fixed points.

Consider the polynomial

Conversely, any polynomial  that satisfies these  congruences, in particular verifies, for any 
 

Generalization to non-coprime moduli
The Chinese remainder theorem can be generalized to non-coprime moduli.

If , then this system has a unique solution modulo . Otherwise, it has no solutions.

If one uses Bézout's identity to write , then the solution is given by

Otherwise, the proof is very similar to that for coprime moduli.

Generalization to arbitrary rings
The Chinese remainder theorem can be generalized to any ring, by using coprime ideals (also called comaximal ideals). The generalization may be stated as follows.

Let  be two-sided ideals of a ring  and let  be their intersection. If the ideals are pairwise coprime, we have the isomorphism: 

between the quotient ring  and the direct product of the 
where "" denotes the image of the element  in the quotient ring defined by the ideal 
Moreover, if  is commutative, then the ideal intersection of pairwise coprime ideals is equal to their product; that is

Interpretation in terms of idempotents

be the isomorphism defined above.

Moreover, one has  and 

Applications

Sequence numbering
The Chinese remainder theorem has been used to construct a Gödel numbering for sequences, which is involved in the proof of Gödel's incompleteness theorems.

Fast Fourier transform

Encryption
Most implementations of RSA use the Chinese remainder theorem during signing of HTTPS certificates and during decryption.

The Chinese remainder theorem can also be used in secret sharing, which consists of distributing a set of shares among a group of people who, all together (but no one alone), can recover a certain secret from the given set of shares. Each of the shares is represented in a congruence, and the solution of the system of congruences using the Chinese remainder theorem is the secret to be recovered. Secret sharing using the Chinese remainder theorem uses, along with the Chinese remainder theorem, special sequences of integers that guarantee the impossibility of recovering the secret from a set of shares with less than a certain cardinality.

Range ambiguity resolution

The range ambiguity resolution techniques used with medium pulse repetition frequency radar can be seen as a special case of the Chinese remainder theorem.

Decomposition of surjections of finite abelian groups 
Given a surjection  of finite abelian groups, we can use the Chinese remainder theorem to give a complete description of any such map. First of all, the theorem gives isomorphisms

where . In addition, for any induced map

from the original surjection, we have  and  since for a pair of primes , the only non-zero surjections

These observations are pivotal for constructing the ring of profinite integers, which is given as an inverse limit of all such maps.

Dedekind's theorem
Dedekind's theorem on the linear independence of characters. Then any finite family  of distinct monoid homomorphisms  is linearly independent. In other words, every family  of elements  satisfying 

must be equal to the family .

Proof. First assume that  is a field, otherwise, replace the integral domain  by its quotient field, and nothing will change. Then, by linearity, the condition

yields

Otherwise  and  would also be proportional, and thus equal since as monoid homomorphisms they satisfy: , which contradicts the assumption that they are distinct.

The Chinese Remainder Theorem (for general rings) yields an isomorphism:

where

Consequently, the map

is surjective. Under the isomorphisms  the map  corresponds to:

Now,

yields

for every vector  in the image of the map . Since  is surjective, this means that

for every vector

Consequently, . QED.

See also
 Covering system
 Hasse principle
 Residue number system

Notes

References

. See in particular Section 2.5, "Helly Property", pp. 393–394.

Further reading
. See Section 31.5: The Chinese remainder theorem, pp. 873–876.

. See Section 4.3.2 (pp. 286–291), exercise 4.6.2–3 (page 456).

External links
 
 
 
 Full text of the Sun-tzu Suan-ching (Chinese) Chinese Text Project

Articles containing proofs
Sun, Master
Commutative algebra
Modular arithmetic
Theorems in number theory